is an American restaurant company founded by Hiroaki Aoki in New York City in 1964 and currently based in Aventura, Florida. It owns or franchises 116 Japanese-influenced restaurants around the world, including its flagship Benihana Teppanyaki brand, as well as the Haru (fusion cuisine) and RA Sushi restaurants. Benihana introduced the teppanyaki (colloquially known as hibachi) restaurant concept, which had originated in Japan in the late 1940s, to the United States, and later to other countries.

History
The company was founded in 1964 on West 56th Street in New York City by 25-year-old Hiroaki Aoki, the father of Steve Aoki and Devon Aoki.

Aoki, a wrestler who had qualified for but did not attend the 1960 Summer Olympics, started the restaurant with  earned from driving an ice cream truck in Harlem.  The first restaurant, Benihana of Tokyo, was named for the red safflower that was the name for the coffee shop owned by his parents in Tokyo.

Aoki's concept was for the meals to be theatrically prepared by a knife-wielding, joke-telling chef at a teppanyaki table surrounded by a wooden eating surface in front of the guests (teppan meaning "steel grill" or "griddle" and yaki meaning "grilled" or "broiled").  It did not do well until early 1965, when Clementine Paddleford of the New York Herald Tribune gave it a rave review.  The Beatles and Muhammad Ali were among the celebrities who then descended on the four-table restaurant.

Within a year Aoki opened a bigger restaurant that featured samurai armor, heavy wooden ceiling beams, and sliding shōji screens to provide some privacy.

In 1968, it opened its first restaurant outside of New York City in Chicago.

In 1976, Aoki brought in consultant Hardwicke Companies (its founder Charles H. Stein was the original developer of Six Flags Great Adventure, as well as the operator of various New York restaurants including Tavern on the Green) as a partner to run the company. In 1980, Aoki terminated the relationship and settled a U.S. Securities and Exchange Commission complaint of insider trading of Hardwicke stock.

In 1982, Benihana National Corporation went public with Joel Schwartz as president. Some of the restaurants continued to be privately owned by Aoki. The company had some missteps including the opening of the upscale Big Splash restaurant and a frozen food division, Benihana National Classics. Its stock dived and shareholders sued over management including the fact that Aoki still had his privately held restaurants of the same name.

In 1995, the company acquired 17 restaurants from Benihana of Tokyo.

The company has since expanded by purchasing the Haru and RA Sushi restaurants, which operate under those names. Haru is based in New York City; RA has locations across the country, and is based in Scottsdale, Arizona, with its original four locations scattered around the greater Phoenix area. Although Benihana owns these concepts, they are independently operated and were developed autonomously. It also acquired the Samurai and Kyoto restaurants which it has incorporated into its other brands.

In 2004, the company issued a class of preferred stock to BFC Financial corporation to renovate its restaurants and expand. The stock diluted Aoki's control of the chain and the family sued, citing that Benihana had no compelling need for the cash, other forms of capital were available, and that the terms of the preferred stock issued to BFC were onerous. A  member of the board of directors was also a director of BFC, a company that held controlling interests in BankAtlantic, Blue Green, and Levitt Homes. However, the Delaware Court of Chancery upheld the decision.

Benihana's famous figural "tiki mugs" for exotic cocktails, the most common of which depicts "Hotei," a chubby buddha-like figure with arms raised in the air, have become collectible.

Aoki died in 2008 at the age of 69.

In 2009, Richard C. Stockinger became chief executive to replace Joel A. Schwartz, and in 2010 became president as Juan C. Garcia resigned.

Benihana agreed in 2012 to be purchased by the private equity firm of Angelo Gordon & Company for $296 million.

On February 5, 2014, the Board of Directors of Benihana Inc. named Steve Shlemon the company's new president and chief executive officer.

In 2016, Benihana Inc. named Thomas J. Baldwin CEO and president. Baldwin had been director of Benihana and served as an advisor to the operator's principal investor, Angelo, Gordon & Co.

Lawsuits

In Benihana of Tokyo, Inc. v. Benihana, Inc., financial issues and a change of corporate control led three of the members of the Benihana, Inc.'s board of directors to consider the issuance of convertible stock and its sale to a potential buyer. Eventually, the entire board approved resolutions ratifying a stock purchase agreement with the buyer and authorizing the stock issuance. Afterwards, the company filed an action against almost all of Benihana, Inc.'s directors, alleging breaches of fiduciary duties.

On January 30, 2011, Benihana (Kuwait) filed a defamation lawsuit against a blogger for writing about his experience on his website. Las Palmas, the company that owns Benihana in Kuwait, took legal action against the reviewer for his "negative" attitudes towards the restaurant and for recording the videos without permission. The company alleged that the blogger worked for an advertising company and might have personal motives that could be linked to his work to denigrate Benihana and praise its competitors located in the same area.

International locations
Benihana operates or franchises restaurants in the United States, the United Kingdom, Slovakia, Romania, The Middle East, and the Caribbean and Central and South America.
North America
El Salvador
United States
South America
Brazil
Panama
Europe
Romania
Slovakia
United Kingdom
Middle East
Jordan
Kuwait
Lebanon
United Arab Emirates
Qatar
Saudi Arabia
South Asia
India

In popular culture 

Benihana was a key location in The Office episode "A Benihana Christmas". The episode shows Michael, Andy, Jim and Dwight dine in a Benihana restaurant throughout the episode.

Benihana is featured prominently in Police Academy 2 and Den of Thieves, as well as during the end of The Wolf of Wall Street.

See also
 List of Japanese restaurants
 List of sushi restaurants

References

Further reading

External links

 North America
 Japan
The Japan Project: Made in Japan (American Film Foundation)

Companies based in Doral, Florida
Japanese-American culture in Florida
Japanese restaurants
Restaurant chains in the United States
Restaurants established in 1964
Sushi restaurants in the United States
Private equity portfolio companies
1964 establishments in New York City
2012 mergers and acquisitions
Japanese-American cuisine
Aoki family